Ruxandra Dragomir was the defending champion of the Volvo Women's Open but lost in the semifinals to Henrieta Nagyová.

Nagyová won in the final 7–5, 6–7, 7–5 against Dominique Van Roost.

Seeds
A champion seed is indicated in bold text while text in italics indicates the round in which that seed was eliminated.

  Ruxandra Dragomir (semifinals)
  Dominique Van Roost (final)
  Florencia Labat (first round)
  Henrieta Nagyová (champion)
  Tamarine Tanasugarn (second round)
  Denisa Chládková (first round)
  Sandra Kleinová (quarterfinals)
  Åsa Carlsson (first round)

Draw

External links
 1997 Volvo Women's Open Draw

Singles
Volvo Women's Open - Singles
 in women's tennis